The Kirsch equations describe the elastic stresses around the hole in an infinite plate in one directional tension. They are named after Ernst Gustav Kirsch.

Result 

Loading an infinite plate with circular hole of radius a with stress σ, the resulting stress field is:

References

Kirsch, 1898, Die Theorie der Elastizität und die Bedürfnisse der Festigkeitslehre. Zeitschrift des Vereines deutscher Ingenieure, 42, 797–807.
Solid mechanics